Ajintha is a Marathi movie directed by acclaimed art filmmaker Nitin Chandrakant Desai. It narrates a love story between a Marathi Buddhist tribal Paro (Sonalee Kulkarni) and British Major Robert Gill (Wallace), an artist, while he visited India to paint the historical monuments and scriptures. It also showcases the historic Ajanta caves and the beautiful scriptures on the walls of the caves depicting the ancient Buddhist culture.

Cast
Sonalee Kulkarni: Paro
Philip Scott Wallace: Major Robert Gill
 Manoj Kolhatkar: Jalal-Ud-Ddin
Avinash Narkar: Pandit
Jan Bostock:  Capt. James Smith
Reena Aggarwal: Kamala
Murli Sharma: Mukhiya
Makarand Deshpande: Daulatya
Manoj Joshi (actor): Nizam
S.N. Patil: Dhanaji

Soundtrack
Background score and the music to the tracks is given by Kaushal Inamdar, and lyrics are penned by Marathi author and poet N. D. Mahanor.

Track list
Following is the track list:

References

External links
 

2012 films
2010s Marathi-language films